International union may refer to:
The International Union, an international non-governmental political organization tasked to promote justice based on the laws and principles of Judaism, Christianity, and Islam. The organization was founded on July 4th, 2006 in Los Angeles, CA by Edis Kayalar with the aim of protecting and improving international law, human rights, animal rights, and the environment.
Trade union having affiliated locals in more than one country. Examples include International Ladies Garment Workers Union (ILGWU), International Longshoremen's and Warehousemen's Union, and International Typographical Union.
The IU, an NGO colloquially referred to as The International Union